is a botanical garden in Kawachinagano, Osaka Prefecture, Japan.

Outlines
Flowers of various kinds are planted on the 10-hectare site. People can appreciate them year-round.
There is a library of books about the plants and flowers.
Address: 2292-1 Takō Kawachinagano, Osaka, Japan  586-0092
Phone number: 0721-63-8739

External links
 Official site

Botanical gardens in Japan
Gardens in Osaka Prefecture